The Tsitsin Main Moscow Botanical Garden of Academy of Sciences was founded in April 1945, and claims itself to be the largest botanical garden in Europe. It covers a territory of approximately 3.61 km², bordering the VDNKH Exhibition Center, and contains a live exhibition of more than twenty thousand different species of plants coming from various parts of the world. The garden also has a scientific research laboratory and contains a rosarium with twenty thousand rose bushes, a dendrarium (arboretum), an oak forest with the average age of the trees exceeding 100 years, a Japanese garden and a greenhouse of more than 5000 square meters.

Gallery

References

Additional sources

External links

Photo of the "Japanese garden" (1024×768)
The Official Site of Russia Museums 
The Site in the Landscape of Gardening Guidebook 

Botanical gardens in Russia
Parks and gardens in Moscow
Russian Academy of Sciences
Cultural heritage monuments of regional significance in Moscow